Marco Meoni (born 25 May 1973 in Padua) is a volleyball player from Italy, who won the silver medal with the Men's National Team at the 1996 Summer Olympics, wearing the number two jersey. A year earlier he was on the side that claimed the European title in Greece. He is a two-time Olympian for his native country, also winning bronze at the 2000 Summer Olympics in Sydney, Australia.

With Copra Piacenza he won the silver medal at the 2007-08 Indesit Champions League and also was individually awarded "Most Valuable Player". After retiring in 2013, he returned to play in Italy's Superlega in January 2015, again for Copra Piacenza.

Clubs
  Copra Piacenza (2007–2008)

Awards

Individuals
 2007–08 CEV Indesit Champions League Final Four "Best Setter"

Clubs
 2007–08 CEV Indesit Champions League -  Runner-Up, with Copra Piacenza

References

External links
RAI Profile

1973 births
Living people
Italian men's volleyball players
Olympic silver medalists for Italy
Olympic bronze medalists for Italy
Olympic volleyball players of Italy
Volleyball players at the 1996 Summer Olympics
Volleyball players at the 2000 Summer Olympics
Volleyball players at the 2008 Summer Olympics
Sportspeople from Padua
Olympic medalists in volleyball
Medalists at the 2000 Summer Olympics
Medalists at the 1996 Summer Olympics